The Medical Scientist Training Programs (MSTPs) are dual-degree training programs that streamline the education towards both clinical (typically MD) and research doctoral degrees. MSTPs are offered by some United States medical schools, who are awarded financial support from the National Institute of General Medical Sciences, a branch of the National Institutes of Health (NIH). The goal of these training programs is to produce physician scientists who can translate laboratory discoveries into effective treatments for patients. 

The NIH began awarding the MSTP designation in 1964. Albert Einstein College of Medicine, Northwestern University, and New York University were the original three MSTP programs that were established. As of 2021, there were 51 NIH-funded MSTP programs in the US (50 MD-PhD, 1 DVM-PhD), supporting about 1000 students at all stages of the program.

History
The program has its origins in the non-NIH funded MD-PhD training offered at the nation's research-centric medical schools. An early dual-degree program began at Case Western Reserve University School of Medicine in 1956. Other prominent medical schools quickly followed this example and developed integrated MD-PhD training structures. 

In 1964, the NIH created the Medical Scientist Training Program to begin funding this medical and research education. Albert Einstein College of Medicine, Northwestern University, and New York University were the original three MSTP programs that were established.

Admissions

Admission to MSTPs is the most competitive of all graduate medical education programs in the country. 

In 2018, 672 of 1855 total applicants successfully matriculated into MD-PhD programs, but only 513 of these slots were at MSTPs, making the matriculation rate for MSTPs nationally 27.7%. 

In comparison, MD-only programs had 40,174 positions for a total of 95,797 applicants (a 41.9% matriculation rate). At each institution, these acceptance rates are varied and are often far more competitive than the national data. Applicants must have very strong MCAT scores and GPAs to be considered for positions in MSTP. Reflecting this fact, from 2018 to 2019 the average GPA and MCAT for matriculants to MSTPs were 3.79 and 515.6, respectively. MSTP applicants will often have very strong research experience as well, in addition to the typical qualifications required from MD-only applicants.  

Interviews for admissions at MSTPs tend to focus on the applicant's career goals and past experiences in scientific research. These may include short research talks or presentations followed by rigorous questioning by an interviewer or interviewing committee. MSTP applicants are often required to demonstrate a deep understanding of their past research projects. Multiple interview sessions conducted by different interviewers that last for 2 days are very common. At some MSTPs, applicants may also be required (or be offered the chance) to interview with the MD-only program.

Financial support

MSTP matriculants receive substantial financial awards that make them financially competitive to their MD-only counterparts even with the longer training periods.  These allowances cover all tuition expenses, provide travel and supply allowances, and accommodate living expenses through an annual stipend (ranging from $26,000 to $39,000). Overall grants typically range from $600,000 - $1,000,000. These monetary awards compare to approximately $250,000 of pre-tax income.

Since MSTP grants are a type of National Research Service Award, students must be nationals (citizens or noncitizens) of the United States or possess a I-151 or I-551 alien registration receipt. However many MSTPs offer non-MSTP grant funded positions, allowing for non-citizens and non-legalized nationals to be accepted into the MD-PhD program at that particular school. These programs are indistinguishable between the students besides the funding source. Furthermore, many non-MSTP medical schools have MD-PhD programs that are not supported by the NIH but offer similar training opportunities and grant money.

Allied-institution programs
Several MSTPs allow for the PhD portion of the MSTP to be completed outside the home university at an allied institution. These relationships provide additional and sometimes stronger research opportunities to students in these MSTPs.

Programs

Outcomes 
According to a 2010 report of students from the 1970s-2010s, 95% of MSTP graduates entered a residency program after graduation. 

Applicants for NIH research grants that completed an MSTP program were three times more likely to be successfully funded than graduates with an MD/PhD that did not participate in an MSTP program.

Non-MSTP MD-PhD programs
A number of medical schools without funded NIH MSTP grant slots maintain their own non-MSTP MD-PhD combined degree programs, sometimes offering full or partial student financial support funded by the schools themselves. As of 2021, 75 institutions provide a means for non-MSTP MD-PhD education in the United States. Internationally, there are 34 non-US institutions that provide MD–PhD training.

See also
American Physician Scientists Association

Notes

References

External links
NIH Overview
American Physician Scientists Association
List of NIH MSTPs

United States educational programs
Medical education in the United States
Training programs